Sebastián Martos Roa (born 20 June 1989) is a Spanish athlete specialising in the 3000 metres steeplechase. He represented his country at the 2013 and 2015 World Championships without qualifying for the final. In addition, he finished fourth at the 2014 European Championships and won the silver medal at the 2013 Summer Universiade. In 2017, he competed in the men's 3000 metres steeplechase at the 2017 World Athletics Championships held in London, United Kingdom.

Competition record

Personal bests
Outdoor
1500 metres – 3:43.45 (Castellón 2011)
3000 metres steeplechase – 8:16.46 (La Nucia 2022)
Indoor
1500 metres – 3:44.11 (Madrid 2017)
3000 metres – 7:50.68 (Madrid 2022)

References

External links

 
 
 
 
 

1989 births
Living people
Spanish male middle-distance runners
Spanish male steeplechase runners
World Athletics Championships athletes for Spain
Sportspeople from the Province of Jaén (Spain)
Athletes (track and field) at the 2016 Summer Olympics
Olympic athletes of Spain
Universiade medalists in athletics (track and field)
Universiade silver medalists for Spain
Medalists at the 2013 Summer Universiade
Athletes (track and field) at the 2020 Summer Olympics